McGoldrick v. Berwind-White Coal Mining Co., 309 U.S. 33 (1940), is United States Supreme Court case upholding the legality under the Constitution's Commerce Clause of a tax by the City of New York upon the purchase of coal by public utility and steamship companies based in New York from Berwind-White Coal Mining Company, a Pennsylvania coal company through its New York office.

See also
 List of United States Supreme Court cases, volume 309

References

External links
 

United States Constitution Article One case law
United States Supreme Court cases
United States Supreme Court cases of the Hughes Court
United States Commerce Clause case law
1940 in United States case law
Coal in the United States
Taxation in New York (state)
Government of New York City
Berwind Corporation
Sales taxes